The 2019 NATC trials season was the 46th season. It consisted of eight trials events in three main classes: Pro, Expert and Womens Pro. It began on 25 May, with round one in Nebraska and ended with round 8 in Oregon on 23 June.

Season summary
Patrick Smage would claim his eleventh NATC championship in 2019, passing Geoff Aaron as the all time championship leader.

New trials manufacturers Vertigo signed Venezuelen seven-times champion David Avendano to ride the series.

British world championship contender Donna Fox competed in the opening Women's Pro round.

2019 NATC trials season calendar

Scoring system
Points were awarded to the top twenty finishers in each class. All eight rounds counted for the Pro class, and the best of seven in Expert and Women's Pro classes were counted.

NATC Pro final standings

{|
|

NATC Expert final standings

{|
|

NATC Women's Pro final standings

{|
|

See also 
 Trial des Nations
 Scott Trial
 FIM Trial World Championship
 FIM Trial European Championship

References

Motorcycle trials
2019 in motorcycle sport